Dr Denis Allan Saunders, AM, (b. 1947) is an Australian ornithologist and conservationist.

Awards
 1998 - received the Individual in Government Award of the International Society for Conservation Biology
 1999 - received the IALE Distinguished Scholarship Award of the International Association of Landscape Ecology
 2005 - made a member of the General Division of the Order of Australia (AM) for "service to nature conservation, particularly through the study of Australian birds and the development of landscape ecology in Australia"
 2006 - awarded the D.L. Serventy Medal of the Royal Australasian Ornithologists Union (RAOU) for outstanding contributions to publication in the science of ornithology in the Australasian region

References

 Olsen, Penny. (2006). D.L. Serventy Medal: Citation. Denis A. Saunders. Emu 106: 339.

Australian ornithologists
Members of the Order of Australia
1947 births
Living people